The Indian flying barb (Esomus danrica), historically flying barb,  is one of the species known in the group flying barbs owing to their extremely long barbels. It was discovered as long ago as 1822 by Hamilton. However, it is rarely seen in aquaria. It is found in Myanmar, Nepal, Pakistan, Sri Lanka and India, it is found in many of the same localities as Danio rerio and Danio dangila, an example being the Jorai Rivulet, a tributary of the Sankosh river in Coochbehar district, West Bengal, India. The rare fish Borellius spp. is locally named "Boirali maach".

Description 
This fish reaches a maximum length of 6 in (15 cm). The Indian flying barb is a silver fish with a black line on an elongated body and gold fins. Barbels reach almost to the anal fin.

Behaviour 
This fish has an exceptional ability for jumping, hence its name.

Research in 2001 by Fang Fang suggests that Esomus is the genus most closely related to Danio, closer even than Devario.

 Temperature preference: 20-25 Celsius
 pH preference: 7.6
 Hardness preference: Soft to medium
 Salinity preference: Zero
 Compatibility: Good but fast like most danios, a largeish fish, needs plenty of space
 Life span: Typically 3 to 5 years
 Ease of keeping: Moderate
 Ease of breeding: Moderate to hard
 A tank with a tight fitting lid with no gaps is recommended.

References

]
 Abstract of Fang, F., 2003. Phylogenetic analysis of the Asian cyprinid genus Danio (telesotei, Cyprinidae).. Copeia (4):714-728.

External links
Esomus danricus
Esomus danricus.BdFISH

Indian flying barb
Fish of Bangladesh
Freshwater fish of India
Indian flying barb
Indian flying barb